The DEL, 2nd Bundesliga and Oberliga are the first three levels of ice hockey in Germany. All three leagues operate nationwide. While the DEL is an independently operated league, the other two are run by the German ice hockey federation, the DEB, through the ESBG. The leagues below the Oberliga are operated by the state federations (German:Landesverbände) and don't run nationwide. The 2006-07 season for the three top leagues started on 7 September 2006 with the first round in the DEL and finished on 17 April 2007 with the third and last game of the DEL finals, with the Adler Mannheim winning their fifth DEL title.

Champions
 DEL: Adler Mannheim
 2nd Bundesliga: EHC Wolfsburg Grizzly Adams
 Oberliga: Heilbronner Falken

Deutsche Eishockey Liga, the DEL

For main article, see Deutsche Eishockey Liga
The DEL is the highest tier of German ice hockey. The league was played with 14 clubs in the 2006-07 season, the same number as the previous season. However, in place of the Kassel Huskies, who were relegated the previous season, the Straubing Tigers took part in the competition, having won the 2nd Bundesliga in 2005-06. The modus had slightly changed from the 2005-06 season. Each club played the other four times, resulting in 52 regular season games per club. The top six clubs at the end of the regular season are qualified for the first round of the play-offs. The clubs seven to ten play a preliminary round to determine the last two places for the first round. For the teams placed eleven to fourteen, the season had ended. No club was relegated from the DEL this season but one new club admitted, the EHC Wolfsburg Grizzly Adams, champion of the 2nd Bundesliga.

Final table
The final table operates under the following points system: Three points for a win, two for a win after overtime or penalties, one for a loss after overtime or penalties and no points for an outright loss.

 Abbreviations: P = Games played, OTW = Overtime win, PW = Win after penalty shootout, OTL = Overtime loss, PL = Loss after penalty shoutout, GF = Goals for, GA = Goals against, (C) = Defending champion, (N) = New club
 Source:

Play-offs
The four rounds of the 2006-07 play-offs were played under the following system:
 Preliminary round: Best-of-three
 First round: Best-of-seven
 Semi finals: Best-of-five
 Finals: Best-of-five
Like the regular season, in the play-offs games will be decided by penalty shoot-outs (P) after a five-minute overtime (OT) sudden-death. In all play-off rounds the higher placed team from the regular season has home advantage in the uneven numbered games (Game 1, 3, 5, 7) and the other team in the even numbered games (Game 2, 4, 6).

Preliminary round

First round

Semi finals

Finals

 The Adler Mannheim are the 2006-07 champions of the DEL.

Play-off tree

Top scorers
The five highest placed scores in the regular season and play-offs are:

Regular season

Play-offs

2nd Bundesliga
For main article, see 2nd Bundesliga
The 2nd Bundesliga is the second highest tier of ice hockey in Germany. The league played with 14 clubs in the 2006-07 season, the same number it had since 2001. Each club played each other four times during the regular season. The top eight teams in the league qualified for the play-offs to determined the 2nd Bundesliga champion who also gained promotion to the DEL this season. For the clubs placed nine and ten, the season has finished after the regular round. The bottom four clubs played out the two relegated teams from the 2nd Bundesliga.

Regular season
The final table operates under the following points system: Three points for a win, two for a win after overtime, one for a loss after overtime and no points for an outright loss.

 Abbreviations: P = Games played, OTW = Overtime win, OTL = Overtime loss, GF = Goals for, GA = Goals against, GD = Goal difference, (R) = Club relegated from the DEL, (N) = New club

Play-offs
The three rounds of the 2006-07 play-offs were played under the following system:
 First round: Best-of-seven
 Semi finals: Best-of-five
 Finals: Best-of-five
In all play-off rounds the higher placed team from the regular season has home advantage in the uneven numbered games (Game 1, 3, 5, 7) and the other team in the even numbered games (Game 2, 4, 6). Should a game be undecided after regular time, there will be one overtime (OT) in sudden death format. Should there still be no winner, the game is decided through penalties (P).

First round

Semi finals

Finals

 The EHC Wolfsburg is the 2006-07 champion of the 2nd Bundesliga and promoted to the DEL.

Play-downs
The play downs consists of only one round, played in a best-of-seven format. The two loser of this round are relegated to the Oberliga.

 The ESC Dresdner Eislöwen and ESV Kaufbeuren are relegated.

Play-off tree

Oberliga
For main article, see Oberliga
The Oberliga is the third tier of ice hockey in Germany and as such the lowest nationwide level, below it are currently the LEV's (Landesverbände). In the 2006-07 season the league played with 14 clubs. However, the Ratinger Ice Aliens were excluded from the competition on 16 November 2006 and all results involving the club canceled.

Each club in the league played each other club four times in the 2006-07 season. The top eight teams then took part in a best-of-seven play-off round to determined the two promoted teams to the 2nd Bundesliga. Because the EHC Wolfsburg was admitted to the DEL, a third Oberliga club was also promoted, this being the SC Riessersee which had been the best placed semi final loser. For the bottom five clubs, the league season was finished after the regular round, due to the expansion of the Oberliga no team was relegated. The teams placed nine to twelve played a cup qualification round however.

Regular season

 Abbreviations: P = Games played, OTW = Overtime win, OTL = Overtime loss, GF = Goals for, GA = Goals against, GD = Goal difference, (R) Club relegated from the 2nd Bundesliga, (N) = New club

Play-offs
The Oberliga play-offs were operating on a best-of-seven modus in the first round and semi finals. The finals were played as best-of-three. The winning teams of the semi finals are promoted to the 2nd Bundesliga.

First round

Semi finals
Winners promoted to 2nd Bundesliga.

Finals

 The Heilbronner Falken, EV Ravensburg  and SC Riessersee are all promoted to the 2nd Bundesliga. The Heilbronner Falken are the 2006-07 Oberliga champions.

Play-off tree

Leagues below the Oberliga
The levels below the Oberliga are not administrated by the DEB but rather by the local federations, the LEV's. With the ESBG's intention to increase the number of clubs in the Oberliga from 13 to 19, seven promotion places were available for the LEV clubs. The league champions and promoted clubs from the regional leagues were:

 Regionalliga West: Herner EG (champions, not promoted), Rote Teufel Bad Nauheim
 Regionalliga Nordost: Blue Lions Leipzig (champions), Rostocker EC, ESC 04 Halle, EHC Erfurt Black Dragons
 Bayernliga:  EHF Passau Black Hawks (champions), Deggendorfer SC

Regionalliga West
The Regionalliga West is actually not quite a league but rather a promotion round. It contains the best six teams of the Regionalliga Nordrhein-Westfalen, and the top two teams of the Regionalliga Hessen and the Baden-Württemberg Liga each. The winner of this league is nominally promoted to the Oberliga. As such, the league covers the German states of Baden-Württemberg, Hessen, Saarland, Rheinland-Pfalz and Nordrhein-Westfalen.

Regionalliga Nordost
This league covers the th north and north east of Germany. Again, it is more of a promotion round, compromising nine teams. In an effort to strengthen the sport in the east of Germany, four clubs from this region were promoted to the Oberliga. The Regionalliga Nordost covers the German states of Niedersachsen, Bremen, Hamburg, Schleswig-Holstein, Mecklenburg-Vorpommern, Berlin, Sachsen-Anhalt, Sachsen and Thüringen.

Bayernliga
Main article see 2006–07 Bavarian ice hockey season
The Bayernliga is the only single-state league of the three, covering just Bavaria. The reason for this is that the state holds approximately one third of all ice hockey clubs in Germany and 17 of the 41 clubs in the first three divisions in 2006-07 were from this federation.

 Source:

Sources
 Hockey Archives - International ice hockey website with tables and results (in French)
 Official website of the ESBG for the 2nd Bundesliga and Oberliga (in German)
 Official DEL website (in German)

References